Edmund Webb (c. 1639 – 13 December 1705) was the member of Parliament for Cricklade for several parliaments from 1679 to 1698, and the member for Ludgershall in 1701 and 1702.

His son John, later John Richmond Webb (1667–1724), who rose to the rank of General in the army, was also returned as an MP and was the builder of Biddesden House near Ludgershall.

References 

|-

|-

External links 

1630s births
1705 deaths
Year of birth uncertain
Members of Parliament for Cricklade
English MPs 1679
English MPs 1681
English MPs 1685–1687
English MPs 1689–1690
English MPs 1690–1695
English MPs 1695–1698
Members of Parliament for Ludgershall
English MPs 1701
English MPs 1701–1702
English MPs 1702–1705
English justices of the peace
English soldiers